The 2011 FIU Panthers football team represented Florida International University in the 2011 NCAA Division I FBS football season. The Golden Panthers were led by fifth-year head coach Mario Cristobal and played their home games at FIU Stadium in Miami, Florida. They are members of the Sun Belt Conference. They finished the season 8–5, 5–3 in Sun Belt play to finish in fourth place. They were invited to the Beef 'O' Brady's Bowl where they were defeated by Marshall 10–20.

Schedule

Attendance record
The UCF game broke attendance records at FIU Stadium with a crowd of 20,205. This record was again broken two weeks later at the FIU Homecoming game versus Duke University on October 1, 2011, with a crowd of 22,628. Additionally, the Goodyear Blimp made its first appearance at FIU Stadium, flying over the stadium throughout the Duke homecoming game. The Miami Tower in Downtown Miami was lit in blue and gold throughout the week of September 26, 2011 to October 1, 2011 in honor of FIU's homecoming.

Game summaries

Duke University
FIU played against Duke University on October 1, 2011 at the FIU Homecoming at FIU Stadium. FIU lost 27–31 in a game where FIU had 589 total yards compared to Duke's 323.

Marshall (Beef 'O' Brady's Bowl)

The Golden Panthers, going bowling for the second year in a row, are led by sophomore running back Kedrick Rhodes with 1,121 rushing yards in a season, ranks second in school history. Rhodes has also caught 26 passes for 248 yards in the passing game.

2012 NFL draftees

References

FIU
FIU Panthers football seasons
FIU Golden Panthers football